Forbidden Lore is an accessory for the 2nd edition of the Advanced Dungeons & Dragons fantasy role-playing game, published in 1992.

Contents

Publication history

Reception
DieHard GameFan said that "To be honest, unless you are a Ravenloft completionist like myself, this isn't a 'must have' set by any means. Nova Arcanum is the only one DMs across the board will make use out of. Everything else is pretty niche and will only appeal to a slice of Ravenloft gamers, and even less will actually make use of them."

Reviews
White Wolf #36

References

Ravenloft supplements
Role-playing game supplements introduced in 1992